KGRX-LD and KGRY-LD are low-power television stations on channels 19 and 28 serving the Phoenix, Arizona, metropolitan area from transmitters on South Mountain. Licensed to serve the Gila River Indian Community and owned by Gila River Telecommunications, a tribal enterprise, KGRY-LD operates in the ATSC 3.0 (Next Gen TV) format and support the forthcoming launch of Evoca, a subscription TV service, in the Phoenix area. KGRX-LD previously operated in ATSC 3.0.

These stations are separate from the Gila River Broadcasting Corporation, which primarily broadcasts First Nations Experience (FNX) from transmitters on the Community itself.

History
In January 2012, the Federal Communications Commission granted the Gila River Indian Community construction permits for a series of television stations to be located on and licensed to serve the tribe. These included K19JT-D and K28MO-D. However, it was more than seven years until activity resumed on the facility; in the case of K28MO-D, the filings by Gila River had to demonstrate that KCOS-LP, a long-defunct analog station on channel 28 whose license was still on the books, was out of service.

In August 2021, the transmitters came into service, operating for the first month with FNX programming in the ATSC 1.0 mode. On September 20, 2021, the stations converted to ATSC 3.0, though Evoca has still to launch in the Phoenix area. Subchannels are in place for the over-the-air distribution of three paid services. As in Boise, customers will pay $9.50 a month for Evoca's Scout box, which is capable of receiving ATSC 1.0, ATSC 3.0, and broadband content.

While in its Boise and Colorado Springs markets, Evoca carries the relevant regional sports network, it has not been able to do so in Phoenix. According to Evoca CEO Todd Achilles, this is because Sinclair Broadcast Group insists that, if Evoca wants to carry Bally Sports Arizona, it must pay retransmission consent fees for Sinclair's broadcast stations in the Boise market (CBS affiliate KBOI-TV and CW affiliate KYUU-LD). In April 2022, KGRX-LD reverted back to ATSC 1.0, citing lack of receivers in use. They returned to ATSC 1.0 with content from two different conservative-themed political networks, Newsmax2 and Real America's Voice. It was later discovered that the station is being programmed by a third party operator, and “the Community is currently considering all available options to remove this programming, which it does not endorse.” As of January 2023 both networks have been removed from the channel and it now carries a simulcast of sister stations KGRQ-LD and KGRF-LD, both affiliates of FNX. KGRY-LD continues to broadcast in ATSC 3.0.

Subchannels

All ATSC 3.0 stations must provide at least one channel of free-to-air television programming. As with Boise's Evoca transmitters, this obligation is fulfilled by airing BYU TV on each transmitter. Evoca offers additional programming utilizing the hybrid functionality of ATSC 3.0, similar to Hybrid Broadcast Broadband TV (HbbTV) in Europe.

A green background indicates an encrypted paid service.

See also
KBSE-LD and KEVA-LD, the Evoca transmitters in Boise, Idaho
Gila River Broadcasting Corporation

References

External links

Arizona page on the Evoca TV website

Low-power television stations in the United States
2021 establishments in Arizona
Television channels and stations established in 2021
Gila River Indian Community
GRX-LD
ATSC 3.0 television stations